Per Kristian Hunder (born 28 April 1989) is a Norwegian freestyle skier. He was born in Lillehammer. He competed at the 2014 Winter Olympics in Sochi, in slopestyle (17th place). He won a 3rd place at Winter X Games 2009 Big Air.  His best results in World Cup is a 3rd place at the Slopestyle event at Jyväskylä.

References

External links 
 

1989 births
Living people
Freestyle skiers at the 2014 Winter Olympics
Norwegian male freestyle skiers
Olympic freestyle skiers of Norway
Sportspeople from Lillehammer